Das Supertalent Season 7 was the seventh season of Germany's Got Talent franchise. Season 7 began on 28 September 2013.

The seventh season premiered in September 2013, and concluded in December 2013. The host remained as Daniel Hartwich, whilst Dieter Bohlen was the only returning judge from season six. Lena Gercke, Guido Maria Kretschmer and Bruce Darnell are new members in the Jury.

Lukas and his dog Falco won the show and €100,000.

Auditions

Episode 1: September 28, 2013

Episode 2: October 4, 2013

Episode 3: October 12, 2013

Episode 4: October 19, 2013

Episode 5: October 26, 2013

Episode 6: November 2, 2013

Episode 7: November 9, 2013

Episode 8: November 16, 2013

Episode 9: November 23, 2013

Semi-finals

Semi-final 2

Final

Guest Performer, Results Show: Robbie Williams

Sources

Das Supertalent
RTL (German TV channel) original programming
2013 German television seasons